LG Arena may refer to:

 LG Arena (KM900), an LG Electronics multimedia phone
 LG Arena (Birmingham), the former name of the Genting Arena, a multi-purpose arena in Birmingham, United Kingdom